Vincent P. Blore (25 February 1907 – 1997) also known as Vince Blore was an English footballer who played as a goalkeeper for Uttoxeter Amateurs, Burton Town, Aston Villa, Derby County, West Ham United, Crystal Palace and Exeter City.

Footballing career
Blore played for Uttoxeter Amateurs, Burton Town and Aston Villa before moving to Derby County in August 1933. He made his debut for Derby on 19 August 1934 in a 2–0 away defeat to Leicester City. Blore made only 15 appearances before moving to West Ham in 1935. Known as "Vic" by West Ham fans, he was signed by manager, Charlie Paynter. His debut came on 31 August 1935 in a 4–3 away defeat to Norwich City. 'Keeper Herman Conway arrived later that season making Blore second-choice and with the arrival of Jack Weare from Wolverhampton Wanderers he became third choice 'keeper. In 1936, Crystal Palace offered him regular first team football. He played for Palace until October 1938, when he signed for Exeter City.

References

1907 births
1997 deaths
English footballers
West Ham United F.C. players
Aston Villa F.C. players
Derby County F.C. players
English Football League players
Crystal Palace F.C. players
Exeter City F.C. players
Association football goalkeepers
Date of death missing
Place of death missing
Burton Town F.C. players
People from Uttoxeter